The Silver Bear for Best Actress was an award presented at the Berlin International Film Festival from 1956 to 2020. It was given to an actress who has delivered an outstanding performance and was chosen by the International Jury from the films in the Competition slate at the festival. Beginning with the 71st Berlin International Film Festival, the award was replaced with two gender-neutral categories, Silver Bear for Best Leading Performance and Silver Bear for Best Supporting Performance.

At the 6th Berlin International Film Festival held in 1956, Elsa Martinelli was the first winner of this award for her performance in Donatella, and Paula Beer was the last winner in this category for her role in Undine at the 70th Berlin International Film Festival in 2020.

History
The award was first presented in 1956, and can be for lead or supporting roles. The prize was not awarded on four occasions (1969, 1973–74, and 1990). In 1970, no awards were given as the festival was called off mid-way due to the controversy over official selection film, o.k. by Michael Verhoeven, which led to the resignation of the international jury. In 2011, the entire female cast of A Separation received the award. Shirley MacLaine has won the most awards in this category, with two. Sachiko Hidari is the only actress to win the award for two different films in the same competition, for her roles in The Insect Woman and She and He (1964).

The last of this award was given out in 2020, after which it was replaced with a gender-neutral categories, Best Leading Performance and Best Supporting Performance the following year.

Winners

Multiple winners 

The following individual(s) have received multiple Best Actress awards:

See also
 Cannes Film Festival Award for Best Actress
 Volpi Cup for Best Actress
 Academy Award for Best Actress
 Academy Award for Best Supporting Actress

Notes

A: Performer to receive a single award which honor the outstanding work in multiple different films in the same official competition slate.
B: The entire male and female cast of A Separation (جدایی نادر از سیمین) was recipient of this award.

References

External links 

 Berlinale website
 Berlin Film Festival at IMDb

Actress
 
Awards disestablished in 2020
Awards established in 1956
Awards for actresses
Film awards for lead actress
Film awards for supporting actress
Silver Bear, Best Actress